Andrew Soutar (1879 – 1941) was a British novelist and journalist.

Biography
Born Edward Andrew Stagg, Soutar married Elspeth Soutar Swinton in 1907 at Prestwich, Lancashire adopting the name Soutar shortly after. Soutar was a correspondent, but is better known today for his novels, which were often serialized in newspapers. He also wrote pulp adventure stories for magazines. Soutar's stories proved very popular with filmmakers, with a number being made into films during the silent era.

Selected novels
Back From the Dead (London, 1920) was made into a 1925 film Back to Life

Filmography
 The Black Night, directed by Harold Weston (UK, 1916, based on the novel The Black Night)
 The Green Orchard, directed by Harold Weston (UK, 1916, based on the novel The Green Orchard)
 The Streets of Illusion, directed by William Parke (1917, based on a story by Andrew Soutar)
 Souls Adrift, directed by Harley Knoles (1917, based on a story by Andrew Soutar)
 , directed by Arthur Hoyt (1918, based on the short story High Stakes)
 The Great Game, directed by A. E. Coleby (UK, 1918, based on the novel The Straight Game)
 His Parisian Wife, directed by Émile Chautard (1919, based on the novel The Green Orchard)
 The Sealed Envelope, directed by Douglas Gerrard (1919, based on a story by Andrew Soutar)
 Snow in the Desert, directed by Walter West (UK, 1919, based on the novel Snow in the Desert)
 Other Men's Shoes, directed by Edgar Lewis (1920, based on the novel Other Men's Shoes)
 , directed by Edgar Lewis (1920, based on the novel A Beggar in Purple)
 Courage, directed by Sidney Franklin (1921, based on a story by Andrew Soutar)
 The Imperfect Lover, directed by Walter West (UK, 1921, based on the novel The Imperfect Lover)
 Love's Redemption, directed by Albert Parker (1921, based on the short story On Principle)
 Was She Justified?, directed by Walter West (UK, 1922, based on the play The Pruning Knife)
 Hornet's Nest, directed by Walter West (UK, 1923, based on the novel Hornet's Nest)
 In the Blood, directed by Walter West (UK, 1923, based on the novel In the Blood)
 Back to Life, directed by Whitman Bennett (1925, based on the novel Back from the Dead)
 Romances of the Prize Ring, seven short films (UK, 1926, based on stories by Andrew Soutar)
 Butterflies in the Rain, directed by Edward Sloman (1926, based on the novel Butterflies in the Rain)
 The Phantom in the House, directed by Phil Rosen (1929, based on the novel The Phantom in the House)
 Worldly Goods, directed by Phil Rosen (1930, based on a story by Andrew Soutar)
 Almost Married, directed by William Cameron Menzies (1932, based on the novel The Devil's Triangle)
 The Man Called Back, directed by Robert Florey (1932, based on the novel Silent Thunder)

Screenwriter
 A Bag of Gold (UK, 1915, short film)
 I Hear You Calling Me (dir. A. E. Coleby, UK, 1919)
 A Gipsy Cavalier (dir. J. Stuart Blackton, UK, 1922)

References

Bibliography
 Peter Brooker & Andrew Thacker. The Oxford Critical and Cultural History of Modernist Magazines: Volume II: North America 1894-1960. Oxford University Press, 2012.

External links

Play by Andrew Soutar on Great War Theatre website

1879 births
1941 deaths
British writers
British male journalists